Trophocosta tucki is a species of moth of the family Tortricidae. It is found in Nepal.

The wingspan is about 13 mm. The forewings are yellow cream, suffused and strigulated with orange in the median area. The dorsum is suffused with orange brownish and the terminal third of the wing is mixed with grey, with darker veins marked with three transverse rows of black dots, edged posteriorly with orange. The hindwings are cream mixed with brownish on the peripheries.

References

Moths described in 1986
Tortricini